Stamford was a constituency in the county of Lincolnshire of the House of Commons for the Parliament of England to 1706 then of the Parliament of Great Britain from 1707 to 1800 and of the Parliament of the United Kingdom from 1801 to 1918. It was represented by two Members of Parliament until 1868 when this was reduced to one.

Boundaries
The parliamentary borough was based upon the town of Stamford in the Parts of Kesteven (a traditional sub-division of the county of Lincolnshire).

When the borough constituency was abolished in 1885, the Stamford (or South Kesteven) division of Lincolnshire was created. This included the town of Stamford and surrounding territory. The county division was a considerably larger constituency than the borough one had been.

From the 1885 general election until the dissolution before the 1918 election the constituency was surrounded by to the north Sleaford; to the east Spalding; to the south east Wisbech; to the south North Northamptonshire; to the south west Rutland; to the west Melton and to the north west Newark. The constituency of Grantham was an enclave wholly surrounded by Stamford.

History
The Victoria County History of the County of Lincoln includes some information about the representation of Stamford in early times.

Stamford, on the other hand, which had sent Nicholas de Burton and Clement de Melton to the Parliament of 1295, only exercised what its burghers probably regarded as an onerous privilege once in the reign of Edward II when in 1322 it elected Eustace Malherbe and Hugh de Thurleby.

A further paragraph relates the position before and after the borough began to send representatives regularly in 1467.

Stamford for some 150 years after the reign of Edward II apparently forbore to exercise its onerous privilege of returning members. In the seventeenth century it was afflicted with the usual controversy prevalent in small communities as to where the right of election lay, and the Committee of Privileges reported in 1661 'That the right of election was in such freemen only as paid scot and lot'.

Sedgwick explained in The House of Commons 1715-1754 that before 1727 the Bertie and Cecil families each nominated one member. From 1727 the Cecil interest controlled both seats. An attempt was made by Savile Cust in 1734 to establish an electoral interest in the borough, but when this failed the Cecils were left with a secure pocket borough.

Namier and Brooke in The House of Commons 1754-1790 confirmed that before the Reform Act 1832 the right of election was in the inhabitants of the parliamentary borough paying scot and lot, a local tax. They estimated the number of voters at about 500 (unchanged from Sedgwick's estimate for the earlier part of the century). In 1754–1790, despite the comparatively large electorate, the constituency was under the control of the Earl of Exeter (the head of the senior branch of the House of Cecil) and elections were uncontested formalities.

The Reform Act replaced the scot and lot franchise with an occupation franchise, which slightly reduced the size of the electorate. This was because the value of the property occupation of which conferred a vote, was higher than that for houses upon which scot and lot became payable.

The area was strongly Tory or Conservative in politics. From 1801 until 1918 it only twice elected an MP from other parties (a Whig in 1831 and a Liberal in 1880). Elections before the 1874 United Kingdom general election were usually uncontested.

The borough had some distinguished representatives in the 19th century. It returned two of the three members of the triumvirate which attempted to lead the protectionist Tories in the House of Commons. The Marquess of Granby had little to commend himself as a political leader, apart from the social prestige of being the heir to the Duke of Rutland. He was briefly sole leader in 1848 before the triumvirate was created in the following year and continued until his resignation in 1851. John Charles Herries had at least held senior ministerial office. Both the Stamford MPs were easily eclipsed by the rising star of their colleague Benjamin Disraeli.

A more significant historical figure was Lord Robert Cecil (Viscount Cranborne 1865–1868) who represented the borough between 1853 and 1868. As the Marquess of Salisbury he was the leading figure in the Conservative Party from the death of Disraeli in 1881 until he retired as Prime Minister in 1902.

Another leading Conservative with connections to the borough was Sir Stafford Northcote, Bt the party leader in the House of Commons 1876-1885 (from 1881 at the same time as Salisbury was leader in the House of Lords). Northcote was a Stamford MP from 1858 to 1866.

Under the Reform Act 1867 the borough electorate was expanded, but it lost one seat in Parliament from the 1868 United Kingdom general election.

The Representation of the People Act 1884 further expanded the electorate. The Redistribution of Seats Act 1885 abolished the borough constituency but created an expanded county division of the same name. These changes took effect with the 1885 United Kingdom general election.

Under the Representation of the People Act 1918 the electorate was again expanded, but the Stamford area was combined with the county of Rutland in a new Rutland and Stamford constituency.

Members of Parliament

MPs 1295–1322

 1295: Nicholas de Burton, Clement de Melton
 1322: Eustace Malherbe, Hugh de Thurleby

After this date no members were returned for a considerable period.

MPs 1467–1640
 1543(?): William Cecil

MPs 1640–1868

MPs 1868–1918

Notes

Election notes
The bloc vote electoral system was used in two seat elections and first past the post for single member by-elections. Each voter had up to as many votes as there were seats to be filled. Votes had to be cast by a spoken declaration, in public, at the hustings (until the secret ballot was introduced in 1872).

Note on percentage change calculations: Where there was only one candidate of a party in successive elections, for the same number of seats, change is calculated on the party percentage vote. Where there was more than one candidate, in one or both successive elections for the same number of seats, then change is calculated on the individual percentage vote.

Note on sources: The information for the election results given below is taken from Namier and Brooke 1754–1790, Stooks Smith 1790-1832 and Craig from the 1832 United Kingdom general election. Where Stooks Smith gives additional information or differs from the other sources this is indicated in a note after the result.

Elections before 1715

Dates of Parliaments 1660-1715

Note:-
 The MPs of the Parliament of England (elected 1705) and 45 members co-opted from the former Parliament of Scotland, became the House of Commons of the 1st Parliament of Great Britain in 1707.

Election results 1715-1800

Elections in the 1710s

Elections in the 1720s

 Succession of Cecil as 8th Earl of Exeter

Elections in the 1730s

 Seat vacated when Noel was appointed to an office

Elections in the 1740s

 Seat vacated when Burghley chose to sit for Rutland

Elections in the 1750s

Elections in the 1760s

 Death of Chaplin

 Seat vacated on the appointment of Brudenell to an office

Elections in the 1770s

Elections in the 1780s

Elections in the 1790s

 Death of Howard

Election Results 1801-1918

Elections in the 1800s
 Creation of Carysfort as a peer of the United Kingdom

 Death of Leland

 Succession of Bertie as the 9th Earl of Lindsey

 Note (1809): Stooks Smith records that the polls were open for two days

Elections in the 1810s

Note (1812): Stooks Smith records that the polls were open for two days

Note (1818): Stooks Smith records that the polls were open for one day

Elections in the 1820s

Elections in the 1830s

Note (1830): Stooks Smith records that the polls were open for four days

Note (1831): Stooks Smith records that the polls were open for three days

Note (1837): Rowley retired before the poll.
 Resignation of Chaplin

Elections in the 1840s

 Seat vacated on the appointment of Clerk as Master of the Mint

 

Note (1847): Stooks Smith has a registered electorate figure of 613, but Craig's figure of 616 is used to calculate turnout.

Elections in the 1850s
 Seat vacated on the appointment of Herries as President of the Board of Control for India

 Resignation of Herries due to ill health

 Seat vacated on the appointment of Thesiger as Lord Chancellor and his elevation to the peerage as the 1st Baron Chelmsford

 Seat vacated on the appointment of Inglis as Lord Justice Clerk with the Scottish judicial title of Lord Glencorse

Elections in the 1860s
 Lord Robert Cecil became known by the courtesy title of Viscount Cranborne, following the death of his brother in 1865.

 Resignation of Northcote to contest by-election in North Devon

 Seats vacated on the appointment of Cranborne as Secretary of State for India and Hay as a Lord Commissioner of the Admiralty.

 Succession of Cranborne as the 3rd Marquess of Salisbury

 Succession of Ingestre as the 19th Earl of Shrewsbury

 Constituency electorate expanded and representation reduced to one seat, by the Reform Act 1867 with effect from the 1868 United Kingdom general election.

Elections in the 1870s

Elections in the 1880s

 Electorate expanded by the Representation of the People Act 1884 and parliamentary borough abolished and replaced by a county division (under the Redistribution of Seats Act 1885) with substantial boundary changes; with effect from the 1885 United Kingdom general election.

Elections in the 1890s
Lawrance resigned after being appointed a Judge of the Queen's Bench division of the High Court of Justice, causing a by-election.

Elections in the 1900s

Elections in the 1910s

General Election 1914–15:

Another General Election was required to take place before the end of 1915. The political parties had been making preparations for an election to take place and by the July 1914, the following candidates had been selected; 
Unionist: Claud Heathcote-Drummond-Willoughby
Liberal: Frank Raffety

See also
 Stamford (UK Parliament list of constituencies)

Sources

References
 Boundaries of Parliamentary Constituencies 1885-1972, compiled and edited by F.W.S. Craig (Parliamentary Reference Publications 1972)
 British Parliamentary Election Results 1832-1885, compiled and edited by F.W.S. Craig (Macmillan Press 1977)
 British Parliamentary Election Results 1885-1918, compiled and edited by F.W.S. Craig (Macmillan Press 1974)
 The House of Commons 1715-1754, by Romney Sedgwick (HMSO 1970)
 The House of Commons 1754-1790, by Sir Lewis Namier and John Brooke (HMSO 1964)
 The Parliaments of England by Henry Stooks Smith (1st edition published in three volumes 1844–50), second edition edited (in one volume) by F.W.S. Craig (Political Reference Publications 1973)) out of copyright
 The Victoria County History of the County of Lincoln: Volume 2, edited by William Page (First published in 1906; reprinted 1988 by Dawsons for the University of London Institute of Historical Research) out of copyright
 Who's Who of British Members of Parliament: Volume I 1832-1885, edited by M. Stenton (The Harvester Press 1976)
 Who's Who of British Members of Parliament, Volume II 1886-1918, edited by M. Stenton and S. Lees (Harvester Press 1978)
 Who's Who of British Members of Parliament, Volume III 1919-1945, edited by M. Stenton and S. Lees (Harvester Press 1979)
 Robert Beatson, A Chronological Register of Both Houses of Parliament (London: Longman, Hurst, Res & Orme, 1807) 
D Brunton & D H Pennington, Members of the Long Parliament (London: George Allen & Unwin, 1954)
Cobbett's Parliamentary history of England, from the Norman Conquest in 1066 to the year 1803 (London: Thomas Hansard, 1808) 
 J E Neale, The Elizabethan House of Commons (London: Jonathan Cape, 1949)

Constituencies of the Parliament of the United Kingdom established in 1295
Constituencies of the Parliament of the United Kingdom disestablished in 1918
Parliamentary constituencies in Lincolnshire (historic)
Politics of Lincolnshire
Stamford, Lincolnshire